Florian Slotawa (born 1972 in Rosenheim) is a German conceptual artist. Rather than creating new objects, Slotawa rearranges and recontextualizes what already exists.

Solo exhibitions (selection)
 2009 'Florian Slotawa' at P.S.1, New York
 2008 Sies + Höke Galerie, Düsseldorf
 "Solothurn, aussen", Kunstverein Solothurn
 2007 "One After The Other", Arthouse, Austin, Texas
 Galleria Suzy Shammah, Milan
 Galerie Friedrich, Basel
 2006 Modern Art, London
 2005 "Land gewinnen", Haus am Waldsee, Berlin
 Sies + Höke Galerie, Düsseldorf
 Galerie Friedrich, Basel
 2004 "Bonn ordnen", Bonner Kunstverein
 VRIZA, Amsterdam
 2003 Kunstmuseum Thun, Thun
 2002 "Gesamtbesitz", Kunsthalle Mannheim
 Sies + Höke Galerie, Düsseldorf
 2001 "Schätze aus zwei Jahrtausenden", Museum Abteiberg Mönchengladbach
 2000 Sies + Höke Galerie, Düsseldorf
 1997 "Einrichtungsversuch", Private apartment, Munich

References

External links
 Sies + Höke Galerie, Düsseldorf: 
 Galleria Suzy Shammah: 
 Galerie Friedrich, Basel: 
 ArtForum review
 Frieze Magazine review
 http://www.florianslotawa.de/

1972 births
Living people
German conceptual artists
German installation artists